Imeni Kirova is the name of several rural localities in Russia:
Imeni Kirova, Republic of Dagestan, a selo in Yuzhny Selsoviet of Kizlyarsky District of the Republic of Dagestan
Imeni Kirova, Georgiyevsky District, Stavropol Krai, a khutor in Alexandriysky Selsoviet of Georgiyevsky District of Stavropol Krai
Imeni Kirova, Trunovsky District, Stavropol Krai, a settlement in Kirovsky Selsoviet of Trunovsky District of Stavropol Krai
Imeni Kirova, Republic of Tatarstan, a settlement in Verkhneuslonsky District of the Republic of Tatarstan
Imeni Kirova, Vladimir Oblast, a settlement in Kameshkovsky District of Vladimir Oblast

See also
pri 8-y GES imeni Kirova, later Imeni Kirova, names of the town of Kirovsk, Leningrad Oblast, before 1953 (then a work settlement)
Kirov, Russia